Lincoln the Mystic, also known as the Abraham Lincoln Memorial, is a bronze statue by James Earle Fraser.
It is located at Lincoln Park in Hudson County, New Jersey, near the beginning of the Lincoln Highway.

A full size bronze replica stands in front of the Maxwell School of Citizenship and Public Affairs at Syracuse University.

History
The sculpture cost $75,000, which was raised by popular subscription. The Lincoln Association of Jersey City commissioned Fraser to design and build the park memorial, which was dedicated on June 14, 1930. The association was also influential in the renaming of West Side Park for President Abraham Lincoln.

The inscription reads:

(On sculpture near base, raised letters:) 
J. E. FRASER. SCULPTOR
(copyright symbol) 1929 
(Around base:) 
MDCCCLXV . MDCCCIX 
(Around base, incised letters:) 
ABRAHAM LINCOLN S. Kunst FDRY NYC signed Founder's mark appears.

The wall behind the sculpture bears the inscription:
WITH MALICE TOWARD NONE AND CHARITY FOR ALL. 
On one side of wall: 
THAT GOVERNMENT OF THE PEOPLE
BY THE PEOPLE FOR THE PEOPLE
SHALL NOT PERISH FROM THE EARTH.
On other side of wall: 
LET US HAVE FAITH THAT RIGHT MAKES MIGHT
AND IN THAT FAITH LET US TO THE END
DARE TO DO OUR DUTY AS WE UNDERSTAND IT.

See also
Route of the Lincoln Highway
Seated Lincoln
List of statues of Abraham Lincoln
List of public art in Jersey City, New Jersey
List of sculptures of presidents of the United States

References

External links

1929 establishments in New Jersey
1929 sculptures
Buildings and structures in Jersey City, New Jersey
Buildings and structures in Hudson County, New Jersey
Bronze sculptures in New Jersey
Bronze sculptures in New York (state)
Monuments and memorials to Abraham Lincoln in the United States
Monuments and memorials in New Jersey
Monuments and memorials in Syracuse, New York
Outdoor sculptures in New Jersey
Statues in New Jersey
Sculptures of men in New Jersey
Statues of Abraham Lincoln
Tourist attractions in Jersey City, New Jersey
Works by James Earle Fraser (sculptor)
Public art in Jersey City, New Jersey